Badian, officially the Municipality of Badian,  is a 3rd class municipality in the province of Cebu, Philippines. According to the 2020 census, it has a population of 43,735 people.

Geography

Badian is bordered to the north by the town of Moalboal, to the west is the Tañon Strait, to the east is the town of Dalaguete, and to the south is the town of Alegria.

Barangays

Badian comprises 29 barangays:

Poblacion

The main barangay of Badian is the Poblacion, located in the center of the town. It is the only urban barangay, and the most populous of Badian. It contains the hospital and the marketplace where most of the trading takes place. Many vendors from all over town trade here particularly at weekends.

Poblacion is where the local high school is located. Badian National High School (BNHS) is one of two high schools in Badian. This is also the larger of the two and many students come from neighboring towns to study here. The lower educational facility in Badian is the Badian Central Elementary School where all the younger children go to school.

Poblacion is also the location of the church of Santiago Apostle, whose feast day is celebrated each 25 July. Held together with the feast of Santiago Apostle is the Banig Festival, the town's flagship festival, celebrating the town's bed making industry.

Climate

Demographics

Economy

Tourism

The Kawasan Falls, a three-layered waterfall, is one of the popular tourist destinations in the province. Canyoning tours are offered upstream of the Kawasan Falls, where the Matutinao river flows through a secluded canyon. There is also the Badian mountain range and the popular trekking destination of Osmeña Peak.

The town's jurisdiction includes Zaragosa or Badian Island, where there is a white sandy private beach and which from there snorkeling and diving activities can be arranged. Nearby Pescador Island, Moalboal offers corals and marine life for divers.

Other tourist attractions of Badian include:
 Cebu International Golf and Resort in Lambug (the only 18hole, par72 course golf course in the town)
the manicured gardens of Terra Manna beach and camping resort
Grandeur Beach Resort located in Lambug Beach
crab hunting in the mangroves.

The town is also hailed as Cebu's "Banig Capital" due to the town's prime product, the "Banig", a woven mat made from Pandanus. The townsfolk are masters of the craft of Banig weaving as much of their skill and prowess in mat weaving was inherited by from forefathers. Because of the booming local economy in matt weaving, the town initiated a major religious-cultural endeavor that was meant to promote the Banigs of Badian. This endeavor came to be recognized as the "Banig Festival", a religious festival in honor of the town's patron saint, St. James the Great, which was also meant to be a major tourism endeavor to promote the mat and the town. The dancers in the participating festival contingents put on stylized and intricately cut and woven costumes made from Banig.

References

Sources

External links

 [ Philippine Standard Geographic Code]

Municipalities of Cebu